Hollywood Star Playhouse is a radio dramatic anthology series in the United States. It was broadcast April 24, 1950-February 15, 1953, appearing on CBS, ABC and NBC over that span.

Format
As the name implies, Hollywood Star Playhouse featured movie stars, as did a number of other old-time radio programs. A news brief announcing the premiere broadcast noted that the program would feature "a different top screen personality each week in original stories of mystery and adventure by leading Hollywood writers." Those stories were what distinguished this program from others, according to radio historian John Dunning. He wrote that the stories were "tense, original suspense plays well suited for the half-hour." Writers usually created scripts for specific stars. One story, The Six Shooter, broadcast April 13, 1952, starred Stewart and later was turned into a series by that same name in which Stewart starred.

Characters and cast
By its nature, Hollywood Star Playhouse had no regular cast. Different movie stars of the era, such as James Stewart, Deborah Kerr and Victor Mature were featured each week. The program was the venue for the radio debuts of Marilyn Monroe, Tony Curtis and Charlton Heston. Casts were rounded out by radio actors such as Wendell Niles, William Conrad, Betty Lou Gerson and Harry Bartell. 

The one consistent voice from week to week was the host-narrator. Herbert Rawlinson originally filled that role, followed by Orval Anderson. Jeff Alexander was the first orchestra leader for the program. Basil Adlam later had that role.

Broadcast history
As indicated in the table below, Hollywood Star Playhouse ran on three networks during its almost three years on radio, with two sponsors during that span. Although many radio programs took the summer off, with replacement programs filling their time slot, Hollywood Star Playhouse continued. An account executive at the advertising agency that handled the program said, "Our agency believes the huge amount of out-of-home listening in car radios and other secondary sets makes radio an excellent buy during the warm weather season."

The period of sponsorship by Bakers of America -- an umbrella group comprising the American Bakers' Association, The Bakers of America and Quality Bakers of America -- produced an unusual situation with regard to commercials. Sponsor magazine reported that Bakers of America asked local bakers not to buy commercial time adjacent to Hollywood Star Playhouse'''s time slot in order to emphasize the industry as a whole. A news brief in the magazine called that decision "[u]nique among institutional air efforts," adding that normally local advertisers bought time in station breaks or immediately before or after a program "to capitalize simultaneously" with the national advertising. That request came in sharp contrast to a comment made earlier by the director of Bakers of America. The January 28 issue of Sponsor reported that Walter H. Hopkins, the organization's director, "said radio presented tremendous opportunity for local tie-ins by bakers."

Adaptation
A version of Hollywood Star Playhouse was available via syndication for television stations. It was included ("over 400 half hours") among a number of programs available from MCA in an eight-page ad in the trade magazine Broadcasting.

See alsoAcademy Award TheaterAuthor's PlayhouseBrownstone TheaterThe Campbell PlayhouseCavalcade of AmericaCBS Radio WorkshopThe Dreft Star PlayhouseFord TheatreGeneral Electric TheaterHollywood PlayhouseLux Radio TheaterThe Mercury Theatre on the AirScreen Director's PlayhouseSuspenseTheater Guild on the Air''

References

External links

Logs
Hollywood Star Playhouse episodic log from Audio Classics Archive
Hollywood Star Playhouse episodic log from RadioGOLDINdex
Hollywood Star Playhouse episodic log from Jerry Haendiges Vintage Radio Logs

Streaming audio
18 episodes of Hollywood Star Playhouse from Internet Archive
18 episodes of Hollywood Star Playhouse from Old Time Radio Researchers Group

Scripts
Script for "The Tenth Planet," as produced on Hollywood Star Playhouse

1950s American radio programs
American radio dramas
CBS Radio programs
ABC radio programs
NBC radio programs
Anthology radio series
1950 radio programme debuts
1953 radio programme endings